Iran competed at the 2006 Winter Olympics in Turin, Italy. Two athletes represented Iran in the 2006 Olympics, one in alpine skiing and one in cross-country skiing. During the opening ceremonies, the Iranian delegation entered to the 1980 disco song "Funkytown."

Competitors

Results by event

Skiing

Alpine

Men

Cross-country

Men

References

External links
 

Nations at the 2006 Winter Olympics
2006 Winter Olympics
Winter Olympics